Richard Congress was a candidate for United States President of the Socialist Workers Party.  He was one of three candidates the party had that year, the others being Andrew Pulley and Clifton DeBerry.  Matilde Zimmermann was the vice presidential candidate on all three tickets.

Congress was on the ballot in Ohio, where he received 4,029 votes.  Congress was also mentioned in a United States Supreme Court decision concerning ballot access, Anderson v. Celebrezze, 460 U.S. 780 (1983).

References
 "General Election, November 4, 1980 Official Tabulation" Ohio Secretary of State

Year of birth missing (living people)
Living people
Socialist Workers Party (United States) presidential nominees
Candidates in the 1980 United States presidential election
20th-century American politicians